The Tomahawk Land Attack Missile (TLAM) is a long-range, all-weather, jet-powered, subsonic cruise missile that is primarily used by the United States Navy and Royal Navy in ship and submarine-based land-attack operations.

Under contract from the U.S. Navy, the Tomahawk was designed at the APL/JHU in a project led by James Walker near Laurel, Maryland, and was first manufactured by General Dynamics in the 1970s. It was intended to fill the role of a medium- to long-range, low-altitude missile that could be launched from a naval surface warfare platform, and featured a modular design accommodating a wide variety of warhead, guidance, and range capabilities. At least six variants and multiple upgraded versions of the TLAM have been added since the original design was introduced, including air-, sub-, and ground-launched variants with conventional and nuclear armaments. In 1992–1994, McDonnell Douglas Corporation was the sole supplier of Tomahawk Missiles and produced Block II and Block III Tomahawk missiles and remanufactured many Tomahawks to Block III specifications. In 1994, Hughes outbid McDonnell Douglas Aerospace to become the sole supplier of Tomahawk missiles.  By 2019, the only variants in service were non-nuclear, sea-launched variants manufactured by Raytheon. In 2016, the U.S. Department of Defense purchased 149 Tomahawk Block IV missiles for $202.3 million.

The Tomahawk was most recently used by the U.S. Navy in the 2018 missile strikes against Syria, when 66 missiles were launched targeting alleged Syrian chemical weapons facilities.

Variants
The variants and multiple upgrades to the missile include:
 BGM-109A Tomahawk Land Attack Missile – Nuclear (TLAM-N) with a W80 nuclear warhead. Retired from service sometime between 2010 and 2013. Reports from early 2018 state that the U.S. Navy is considering reintroducing a (yet unknown type of) nuclear-armed cruise missile into service.
 RGM/UGM-109B Tomahawk Anti-Ship Missile (TASM) – Anti-ship missile variant with active radar homing; withdrawn from service in 1994 and converted to Block IV version.
 BGM-109C Tomahawk Land Attack Missile – Conventional (TLAM-C) with a unitary warhead. This was initially a modified Bullpup warhead.
 BGM-109D Tomahawk Land Attack Missile – Dispenser (TLAM-D) with cluster munitions.
 Kit 2 Tomahawk Land Attack Missile - with a unique warhead used to disable electrical grids. First used in the Gulf War.
 RGM/UGM-109E Tomahawk Land Attack Missile (TLAM-E Block IV) – improved version of the TLAM-C.
 BGM-109G Ground Launched Cruise Missile (GLCM) – with a W84 nuclear warhead; withdrawn from service in 1991 to comply with the INF Treaty.
 AGM-109H/L Medium Range Air-to-Surface Missile (MRASM) – a shorter-range, turbojet powered air-launched cruise missile with cluster munitions; never entered service, cost 569,000 (1999).

Ground-launched cruise missiles (GLCM) and their truck-like launch vehicles were employed at bases in Europe; they were withdrawn from service to comply with the 1987 Intermediate-Range Nuclear Forces Treaty. Many of the anti-ship versions were converted into TLAMs at the end of the Cold War. The Block III TLAMs that entered service in 1993 can fly 3 percent farther using their new turbofan engines and use Global Positioning System (GPS) receivers to strike more precisely. Block III TLAM-Cs retain the Digital Scene Matching Area Correlation (DSMAC) II navigation system, allowing three kinds of navigation: GPS-only, which allow for rapid mission planning, with some reduced accuracy, DSMAC-only, which take longer to plan but terminal accuracy is somewhat better; and GPS-aided missions that combine DSMAC II and GPS navigation for greatest accuracy. Block IV TLAMs have an improved turbofan engine that allows them to get better fuel economy and change speeds in flight. The Block IV TLAMs can loiter better and have electro-optical sensors that allow real-time battle damage assessment. The Block IVs can be given a new target in flight and can transmit an image, via satcom, immediately before impact to help determine whether the missile is on target and the likely damage from the attack.

Upgrades

A major improvement to the Tomahawk is network-centric warfare-capabilities, using data from multiple sensors (aircraft, UAVs, satellites, foot soldiers, tanks, ships) to find its target. It will also be able to send data from its sensors to these platforms.

Tomahawk Block II variants were all tested during January 1981 to October 1983. Deployed in 1984, some of the improvements included: an improved booster rocket, cruise missile radar altimeter, and navigation through the Digital Scene Matching Area Corellator (DSMAC). DSMAC was a highly accurate rudimentary AI which allowed early low power computers to navigate and precisely target objectives using cameras on board the missile. With its ability to visually identify and aim directly at a target, it was more accurate than weapons using estimated GPS coordinates. Due to the very limited computer power of the day, DSMAC did not directly evaluate the maps, but instead would compute contrast maps and then combine multiple maps into a buffer, then compare the average of those combined images to determine if it was similar to the data in its small memory system. The data for the flight path was very low resolution in order to free up memory to be used for high resolution data about the target area. The guidance data was computed by a mainframe computer which took spy satellite photos and estimated what the terrain would appear like during low level flight. Since this data would not match the real terrain exactly, and since terrain changes seasonally and with changes in light quality, DSMAC would filter out differences between maps and use the remaining similar sections in order to find its location regardless of changes in how the ground appeared. It also had an extremely bright strobe light it could use to illuminate the ground for fractions of a second in order to find its position at night, and was able to take the difference in ground appearance into account.

Tomahawk Block III introduced in 1993 added time-of-arrival control and improved accuracy for Digital Scene Matching Area Correlator (DSMAC) and jam-resistant GPS, smaller, lighter WDU-36 warhead, engine improvements and extended missile's range.

Tactical Tomahawk Weapons Control System (TTWCS) takes advantage of a loitering feature in the missile's flight path and allows commanders to redirect the missile to an alternative target, if required. It can be reprogrammed in-flight to attack predesignated targets with GPS coordinates stored in its memory or to any other GPS coordinates. Also, the missile can send data about its status back to the commander. It entered service with the US Navy in late 2004. The Tactical Tomahawk Weapons Control System (TTWCS) added the capability for limited mission planning on board the firing unit (FRU).

Tomahawk Block IV introduced in 2006 adds the strike controller which can change the missile in flight to one of 15 preprogrammed alternate targets or redirect it to a new target. This targeting flexibility includes the capability to loiter over the battlefield awaiting a more critical target. The missile can also transmit battle damage indication imagery and missile health and status messages via the two-way satellite data link. Firing platforms now have the capability to plan and execute GPS-only missions. Block IV also has an improved anti-jam GPS receiver for enhanced mission performance.
Block IV includes Tomahawk Weapons Control System (TTWCS), and Tomahawk Command and Control System (TC2S).

On 16 August 2010, the Navy completed the first live test of the Joint Multi-Effects Warhead System (JMEWS), a new warhead designed to give the Tomahawk the same blast-fragmentation capabilities while introducing enhanced penetration capabilities in a single warhead.  In the static test, the warhead detonated and created a hole large enough for the follow-through element to completely penetrate the concrete target. In February 2014, U.S. Central Command sponsored development and testing of the JMEWS, analyzing the ability of the programmable warhead to integrate onto the Block IV Tomahawk, giving the missile bunker buster effects to better penetrate hardened structures.

In 2012, the USN studied applying Advanced Anti-Radiation Guided Missile (AARGM) technology into the Tactical Tomahawk.

In 2014, Raytheon began testing Block IV improvements to attack sea and moving land targets. The new passive radar seeker will pick up the electromagnetic radar signature of a target and follow it, and actively send out a signal to bounce off potential targets before impact to discriminate its legitimacy before impact. Mounting the multi-mode sensor on the missile's nose would remove fuel space, but company officials believe the Navy would be willing to give up space for the sensor's new technologies. The previous Tomahawk Anti-Ship Missile, retired over a decade earlier, was equipped with inertial guidance and the seeker of the Harpoon missile and there was concern with its ability to clearly discriminate between targets from a long distance, since at the time Navy sensors did not have as much range as the missile itself, which would be more reliable with the new seeker's passive detection and millimeter-wave active radar homing. Raytheon estimates adding the new seeker would cost $250,000 per missile. Other upgrades include a sea-skimming flight path. The first Block IV TLAMs modified with a maritime attack capability will enter service in 2021.

A supersonic version of the Tomahawk is under consideration for development with a ramjet to increase its speed to Mach 3.  A limiting factor to this is the dimensions of shipboard launch tubes.  Instead of modifying every ship able to carry cruise missiles, the ramjet-powered Tomahawk would still have to fit within a -diameter and -long tube.

In October 2015, Raytheon announced the Tomahawk had demonstrated new capabilities in a test launch, using its onboard camera to take a reconnaissance photo and transmit it to fleet headquarters.  It then entered a loitering pattern until given new targeting coordinates to strike.

By January 2016, Los Alamos National Laboratory was working on a project to turn unburned fuel left over when a Tomahawk reaches its target into an additional explosive force.  To do this, the missile's JP-10 fuel is turned into a fuel air explosive to combine with oxygen in the air and burn rapidly.  The thermobaric explosion of the burning fuel acts, in effect, as an additional warhead and can even be more powerful than the main warhead itself when there is sufficient fuel left in the case of a short-range target.

Tomahawk Block V was introduced in 2021 with improvements to navigation and in-flight targeting. Block Va, the Maritime Strike Tomahawk (MST) which allows the missile to engage a moving target at sea, and Block Vb outfitted with the JMEWS warhead for hard-target penetration, will be released after the initial batch of Block V is delivered in March 2021. All Block IV Tomahawks will be converted to Block V standard, while the remaining Block III missiles will be retired and demilitarized.

Tomahawk Block V have longer range and dynamic targeting with the capability to hit vessels at sea (maritime strike role). Raytheon is recertifying and modernizing the missile, extending its service life by 15 years, and resulting in the new Tomahawk Block V series:
 Block V: A modernized TACTOM with upgraded navigation and communication
 Block VA: Block V that can strike moving targets at sea
 Block VB: Block V, with a joint multi-effects warhead that can hit more diverse land targets.

In 2020, Los Alamos National Laboratory reported that it would use corn ethanol to produce domestic fuel for Tomahawk missiles, which also does not require harsh acids to manufacture, compared to petroleum-based JP-10.

Launch systems

Each missile is stored and launched from a pressurized canister that protects it during transportation and storage, and also serves as a launch tube. The ABLs were also installed on eight s, the four s, and the nuclear cruiser . These canisters are also in vertical launching systems (VLS) in other surface ships, capsule launch systems (CLS) in the later  and s, and in submarines' torpedo tubes.
All ABL equipped ships have been decommissioned.

For submarine-launched missiles (called UGM-109s), after being ejected by gas pressure (vertically via the VLS) or by water impulse (horizontally via the torpedo tube), a solid-fuel booster is ignited to propel the missile and guide it out of the water.

After achieving flight, the missile's wings are unfolded for lift, the airscoop is exposed and the turbofan engine is employed for cruise flight. Over water, the Tomahawk uses inertial guidance or GPS to follow a preset course; once over land, the missile's guidance system is aided by terrain contour matching (TERCOM). Terminal guidance is provided by the Digital Scene Matching Area Correlation (DSMAC) system or GPS, producing a claimed circular error probable of about 10 meters.

The Tomahawk Weapon System consists of the missile, Theater Mission Planning Center (TMPC)/Afloat Planning System, and either the Tomahawk Weapon Control System (on surface ships) or Combat Control System (for submarines).

Several versions of control systems have been used, including:
 v2 TWCS – Tomahawk Weapon Control System (1983), also known as "green screens," was based on an old tank computing system.
 v3 ATWCS – Advanced Tomahawk Weapon Control System (1994), first Commercial Off the Shelf, uses HP-UX.
 v4 TTWCS – Tactical Tomahawk Weapon Control System, (2003).
 v5 TTWCS – Next Generation Tactical Tomahawk Weapon Control System. (2006)

On August 18, 2019, the United States Navy conducted a test flight of a Tomahawk missile launched from a ground-based version of the Mark 41 Vertical Launch System. It was the United States' first acknowledged launch of a missile that would have violated the 1987 Intermediate-Range Nuclear Forces Treaty, from which the Trump administration withdrew on August 2 after Russia broke it.

Munitions
The TLAM-D contains 166 sub-munitions in 24 canisters: 22 canisters of seven each, and two canisters of six each to conform to the dimensions of the airframe. The sub-munitions are the same type of Combined Effects Munition bomblet used in large quantities by the U.S. Air Force with the CBU-87 Combined Effects Munition. The sub-munitions canisters are dispensed two at a time, one per side. The missile can perform up to five separate target segments which enables it to attack multiple targets. However, in order to achieve a sufficient density of coverage typically all 24 canisters are dispensed sequentially from back to front.

Navigation
TERCOM – Terrain Contour Matching. A digital representation of an area of terrain is mapped based on digital terrain elevation data or stereo imagery. This map is then inserted into a TLAM mission which is then loaded onto the missile. When the missile is in flight it compares the stored map data with radar altimeter data collected as the missile overflies the map. Based on comparison results the missile's inertial navigation system is updated and the missile corrects its course. TERCOM was based on, and was a significant improvement on, "Fingerprint," a technology developed in 1964 for the SLAM.

DSMAC – Digital Scene Matching Area Correlation. A digitized image of an area is mapped and then inserted into a TLAM mission. During the flight the missile will verify that the images that it has stored correlates with the image it sees below itself. Based on comparison results the missile's inertial navigation system is updated and the missile corrects its course.

Operational history

United States

Air Force

The Air Force is a former operator of the nuclear-armed version of the Tomahawk, the BGM-109G Gryphon.

Army
In November 2020, the U.S. Army selected the Tomahawk to fulfill its Mid-Range Capability (MRC), giving it a land-based long-range missile capable of striking ground and sea targets. The Army plans to use the Tomahawk alongside a ground-based SM-6 and field them by late 2023.

Navy

In the 1991 Gulf War, 288 Tomahawks were launched, 12 from submarines and 276 from surface ships. The first salvo was fired by the destroyer  on January 17, 1991. The attack submarines  and  followed.

On 17 January 1993, 46 Tomahawks were fired at the Zafraniyah Nuclear Fabrication Facility outside Baghdad, in response to Iraq's refusal to cooperate with UN disarmament inspectors. One missile crashed into the side of the Al Rasheed Hotel, killing two civilians.

On 26 June 1993, 23 Tomahawks were fired at the Iraqi Intelligence Service's command and control center.

On 10 September 1995,  launched 13 Tomahawk missiles from the central Adriatic Sea against a key air defense radio relay tower in Bosnian Serb territory during Operation Deliberate Force.

On 3 September 1996, 44 ship-launched UGM-109 and B-52-launched AGM-86 cruise missiles were fired at air defense targets in southern Iraq.

On 20 August 1998, 79 Tomahawk missiles were fired simultaneously at two targets in Afghanistan and Sudan in retaliation for the bombings of American embassies by Al-Qaeda.

On 16 December 1998, 325 Tomahawk missiles were fired at key Iraqi targets during Operation Desert Fox.

In early 1999, 218 Tomahawk missiles were fired by U.S. ships and a British submarine during the 1999 NATO bombing of Yugoslavia against targets in the Federal Republic of Yugoslavia.

In October 2001, about 50 Tomahawk missiles struck targets in Afghanistan in the opening hours of Operation Enduring Freedom.

During the 2003 invasion of Iraq, more than 802 Tomahawk missiles were fired at key Iraqi targets.

On 3 March 2008, two Tomahawk missiles were fired at a target in Somalia by a US vessel during the Dobley airstrike, reportedly in an attempt to kill Saleh Ali Saleh Nabhan, an al Qaeda militant.

On 17 December 2009, two Tomahawk missiles were fired at targets in Yemen. One TLAM-D struck an alleged Al-Qaeda training camp in al-Ma’jalah in al-Mahfad, a region of the Abyan governorate of Yemen. Amnesty International reported that 55 people were killed in the attack, including 41 civilians (21 children, 14 women, and six men). The US and Yemen governments refused to confirm or deny involvement, but diplomatic cables released as part of United States diplomatic cables leak later confirmed the missile was fired by a U.S. Navy ship.

On 19 March 2011, 124 Tomahawk missiles were fired by U.S. and British forces (112 US, 12 British) against at least 20 Libyan targets around Tripoli and Misrata. As of 22 March 2011, 159 UGM-109 were fired by US and UK ships against Libyan targets.

The strike was in response to a chemical weapons attack, an act allegedly carried out by Syrian President Bashar Al-Assad. U.S. Central Command stated in a press release that Tomahawk missiles hit "aircraft, hardened aircraft shelters, petroleum and logistical storage, ammunition supply bunkers, defense systems, and radars". Initial U.S. reports claimed "approximately 20 planes" were destroyed, and that 58 out of the 59 cruise missiles launched had "severely degraded or destroyed" their intended target. A later report by US Secretary of Defense James Mattis claimed that the strike destroyed about 20% of the Syrian government's operational aircraft. Syrian state-run media claimed that nine civilians, including four children living in nearby villages were killed and another seven wounded as a result of the strike after missiles fell on their homes, The Pentagon would later state civilians were not intentionally targeted. According to the satellite images the runways and the taxiways have been  undamaged and combat flights from the attacked airbase resumed on 7 April a few hours after the attack, although U.S. officials did not state that the runway was a target.

An independent bomb damage assessment conducted by ImageSat International counted hits on 44 targets, with some targets being hit by more than one missile; these figures were determined using satellite images of the airbase 10 hours after the strike. However, the Russian defense ministry contends that the combat effectiveness of the attack was "extremely low"; only 23 missiles hit the base destroying six aircraft, and it did not know where the other 36 landed. Russian television news, citing a Syrian source at the airfield, said that nine planes were destroyed by the strikes (5 Su-22M3s, 1 Su-22M4, and 3 Mig-23ML) and that all planes were thought to have been out of action at the time.  Al-Masdar News reported that 15 fighter jets were damaged or destroyed and that the destruction of fuel tankers caused several explosions and a large fire. Some observers conclude that the Russian government—and therefore also the Syrian government—was warned and Syria had enough time to move most of the planes to another base. The Syrian Observatory for Human Rights said the strike damaged over a dozen hangars, a fuel depot, and an air defense base.

On April 14, 2018, the US launched 66 Tomahawk cruise missiles at Syrian targets near Damascus and Homs, as part of the 2018 bombing of Damascus and Homs. These strikes were done in retaliation for Douma chemical attack. The United States Department of Defense said Syria fired 40 defensive missiles at the allied weapons but did not hit any targets. The Russian military said that Syrian air defenses shot down 71 of the 103 missiles launched by the US and its allies, but it was not possible to verify the claims.

Royal Navy
In 1995, the US agreed to sell 65 Tomahawks to the UK for torpedo-launch from their nuclear attack submarines. The first missiles were acquired and test-fired in November 1998; all Royal Navy fleet submarines are now Tomahawk capable, including the Astute-class. The Kosovo War in 1999 saw the Swiftsure-class HMS Splendid become the first British submarine to fire the Tomahawk in combat. The UK subsequently bought 20 more Block III to replenish stocks. The Royal Navy has since fired Tomahawks during the 2000s Afghanistan War, in Operation Telic as the British contribution to the 2003 Iraq War, and during Operation Ellamy in Libya in 2011.

In April 2004, the UK and US governments reached an agreement for the British to buy 64 of the new generation of Tomahawk missile—the Block IV or TacTom missile. It entered service with the Royal Navy on 27 March 2008, three months ahead of schedule.  In July 2014 the US approved the sale to the UK of a further 65 submarine-launched Block IV's at a cost of US$140m including spares and support;  the Block III missiles were on British books at £1.1m and the Block IV at £0.87m including VAT.

The Sylver Vertical Launching System on the new Type 45 destroyer is claimed by its manufacturers to have the capability to fire the Tomahawk, although the A50 launcher carried by the Type 45 is too short for the weapon (the longer A70 silo would be required). Nevertheless, the Type 45 has been designed with weight and space margin for a strike-length Mk41 or Sylver A70 silo to be retrofitted, allowing Type 45 to use the TLAM Block IV if required. The new Type 26 frigates will have a strike-length Mk41 VLS and the Type 31 frigate will also be fitted for but not with the system.

In June 2022, the UK announced it would be upgrading its Tomahawk cruise missiles to Block V standard through a £265 million contract with the US government. The missiles will be upgraded from 2024.

Canada
According to infographics released by Royal Canadian Navy, their new frigates (CSC) will be equipped with the missile.

Australia
In September 2021, Australian Prime Minister Scott Morrison announced that Australia would acquire Tomahawks for the Royal Australian Navy's Hobart-class  air warfare destroyers. In March 2023, the US State Department approved a Foreign Military Sale to sale Australia of up 200 Block V and up to 20 Block IV missiles worth an estimated $US895 million.

Japan
Japanese government is approaching the U.S. government to purchase the U.S.-made Tomahawk cruise missile for attacking enemy base, counterattack. The Japanese government decided to purchase the Tomahawk cruise missile before their domestic improved range "Type 12 Surface-to-Ship Missile" start full-scale operation. Prime Minister Fumio Kishida announced Japan will be buying 400 Tomahawk missiles. They which will be deployed in fiscal year 2026-27 and will serve as a bridge until the deployment of indigenous missiles like the extended range Type 12 Surface-to-Ship Missile and the Hyper Velocity Gliding Projectile.

Other users
The Netherlands (2005) and Spain (2002 and 2005) were interested in acquiring the Tomahawk system, but the orders were later cancelled in 2007 and 2009 respectively.

In 2009, the Congressional Commission on the Strategic Posture of the United States stated that Japan would be concerned if the TLAM-N were retired, but the government of Japan has denied that it had expressed any such view.

The SLCM version of the Popeye was developed by Israel after the US Clinton administration refused an Israeli request in 2000 to purchase Tomahawk SLCM's because of international Missile Technology Control Regime proliferation rules.

As of March 12, 2015, Poland has expressed interest in purchasing long-range Tomahawk missiles for its future submarines.

In 2022 plans for acquiring long-range and precision-guided weapon systems for the s and submarines of The Royal Netherlands Navy are announced as part of the Strategic Defence Review 2022, Tomahawk is considered a serious contender. In March 2023, the commander of the Royal Netherlands Navy announced in a column that the project to acquire maritime strike capability had been approved by the Ministry of Defence, and would include both the De Zeven Provinciën-class frigates and the Walrus-class submarines. While no announcement on missile type was made, it is again heavily speculated to be Tomahawk as the frigates and submarines are equipped with US-standard Mark 41 Vertical Launching System, and torpedo tubes suited for launching UGM-109 Tomahawk respectively.

Operators

Current operators

 Royal Navy
 
 US Navy
 US Army
 US Marine Corps

Future operators

 Royal Australian Navy
 
 Royal Canadian Navy

 Japan Maritime Self-Defense Force
 
 Royal Netherlands Navy

See also
 List of missiles
 Babur (cruise missile)
 AV-TM 300
 BrahMos
 Nirbhay
 Shaurya
 Hoveyzeh
 Hsiung Feng IIE
 RK-55
 3M-54 Kalibr
 Raduga Kh-55
 AGM-129 ACM
 Hyunmoo-3
 DH-10
 UGM-89 Perseus
 ArcLight (missile)
 MdCN (missile)

References

External links 

 Raytheon official site for the Tomahawk missile
 CSIS Missile Threat - Tomahawk Cruise Missile

Naval cruise missiles
Submarine-launched cruise missiles
Cruise missiles of the Cold War
Nuclear cruise missiles of the United States
Nuclear cruise missiles of the United States Navy
Guided missiles of the United States Navy
Cold War anti-ship missiles of the United States
Cruise missiles of the United Kingdom
Cruise missiles of the United States
Raytheon Company products
Weapons and ammunition introduced in 1983